Easton is the name of some places in the U.S. state of Wisconsin:

Easton, Adams County, Wisconsin, a town
Easton (community), Wisconsin, in Adams County, an unincorporated community
Easton, Marathon County, Wisconsin, a town